Nazzal is a name of Arabic origin which is used as a surname and a masculine given name. People with the name include:

Surname
Khaled Nazzal (died 1986), Palestinian militant leader
Hamad Nazzal, American journalist and writer
Mary Nazzal-Batayneh (born 1979), Palestinian Jordanian barrister
Ranah Nazzal (born 1969), Jordanian writer and poet
Rehab Nazzal, Palestinian-born Canadian artist
Yusuf Nazzal (1937–1972), Palestinian militant leader

Given name
Nazzal al-Armouti (1924–2015), Jordanian diplomat and politician

Surnames of Palestinian origin
Arabic masculine given names